Naseeruddin Saami (born 1945) is a classical singer from Pakistan. He is called ustad for his mastery of classical music. He is best known for his Khyal style of singing. He began learning singing in 1950s from another renowned classical vocalist and musician of his time Ustad Wahid Hussain Khan. He belongs to Delhi Gharana of music style. He sings in style of ‘Khayal Vocalist’. He is recipient of Tamgha-e-Imtiaz for service to music.

Ustad Saami is the last living vocal practitioner of an ancient 49-note microtonal Surti (or shruti) scale. He is featured in the 90 minutes documentary movie by Swiss director Annette Berger which was released in 2018 and has been shown in numerous festivals worldwide.

References

Muhajir people
Pakistani classical singers
Pakistani male singers
Recipients of Tamgha-e-Imtiaz
20th-century Khyal singers
20th-century Indian male singers
20th-century Indian singers